Augusta Wallace was a Louisville, Kentucky-born stage actress, known for her appearances in productions of Tobacco Road in the 1940s.

Appearances
Tobacco Road (revival) as "Pearl" (replacement) from September 5, 1942 – October 3, 1942
Lightnin'  as "Mrs. Jordan" from September 15, 1938 – November 1938
Tobacco Road (original production) as "Pearl" (replacement) from December 4, 1933 – May 31, 1941

External links

Year of birth missing
Year of death missing
American stage actresses
Actresses from Louisville, Kentucky